Cassie Andrews (born November 16, 1993) is an American pair skater. With former partner Timothy Leduc, she placed ninth at the 2011 World Junior Championships. Between 2004 and 2010, she competed with Nicholas Anderson. She also competed as a single skater until 2009. Andrews now trains and coaches ice skating in Indiana.

Programs

With Leduc

With Anderson

Results

With Leduc

With Anderson

References

External links 
 
 

American female pair skaters
1993 births
Living people
People from Greenfield, Indiana
21st-century American women
20th-century American women